The 1923 Paris–Roubaix was the 24th edition of the Paris–Roubaix, a classic one-day cycle race in France. The single day event was held on 1 April 1923 and stretched  from Paris to its end in a velodrome in Roubaix. The winner was Heiri Suter from Switzerland.

Results

References

Paris–Roubaix
Paris–Roubaix
Paris–Roubaix
Paris–Roubaix